The Loretta Young Show (originally known as Letter to Loretta) is an American anthology drama television series broadcast on Sunday nights from September 2, 1953, to June 4, 1961, on NBC for a total of 165 episodes. The series was hosted by actress Loretta Young, who also played the lead in various episodes.

Series overview
The Loretta Young Show was sponsored by Procter & Gamble for its first six seasons, from 1953 to 1959. After a dispute with her sponsor, Young found other sponsors to sustain her program: The Toni Company (1959-1961), Philip Morris (1959-1960), and Warner-Lambert's Listerine (1960-1961).

The program began with the premise that each drama was an answer to a question asked in her fan mail; the program's original title was Letter to Loretta. The title was changed to The Loretta Young Show during the first season (as of February 14, 1954), and the "letter" concept was dropped altogether at the end of the second season. At this time, Young's health, which had deteriorated due to a heavy production schedule during the second season, required a number of guest hosts and guest stars; her first appearance in the 1955–56 season was for the Christmas show.

From this point on, Young appeared in only about half of each season's shows as an actress and merely functioned as the program hostess for the remainder. She became known for swirling around in her gowns during her entrance through a door at the start of the show, a convention parodied by many comedians, including Ernie Kovacs.

Young was quoted as saying<ref>p.207 Bowers, Ronald L. Loretta Young Films in Review April 1969 Vol XX no 4</ref> After the audience had seen me well-groomed, I can wear horrible clothes, ugly make-up, or even a false nose during the show without anyone wondering whether I've aged overnight or something.

This program, minus Young's introductions and summarized conclusions (Young insisted on their deletion due to her concern that the dresses she wore in those segments would "date" the program), was rerun in daytime by NBC as The Loretta Young Theatre from October 1960 to December 1964, and then appeared, again without the introductions and conclusions, in syndication through the 1970s. In 1992, selected episodes of the original series (with Young's opening and closing segments intact), authorized by Young herself and chosen from her personal collection of 16 mm film prints, were released on home video, and eventually shown on cable television.

During the series' eight-year run, the series was popular with audiences and critics, and it finished in 28th place in the Nielsen ratings in the spring of 1955. It finished its last season far behind its competition, Candid Camera on CBS, and was thereby cancelled. In 1954, Billboard voted it the third-best network filmed drama series.

Selected guest stars

 Julie Adams
 John Agar
 Claude Akins
 Rico Alaniz
 Anna Maria Alberghetti
 Eddie Albert
 Eleanor Audley
 Jean-Pierre Aumont
 Frances Bavier
 Gene Barry
 Hugh Beaumont
 Barbara Billingsley
 Charles Bronson
 Argentina Brunetti
 Ellen Burstyn
 Richard Carlson
 Mae Clark
 Mike Connors
 Chuck Connors
 Jackie Coogan
 Johnny Crawford
 Hume Cronyn
 Pat Crowley
 Jane Darwell
 Laraine Day
 Elinor Donahue
 Bobby Driscoll
 Joanne Dru
 James Drury
 Irene Dunne
 Shelley Fabares
 Steve Forrest
 Nina Foch
 William Frawley
 Kathleen Freeman
 Alan Hale Jr.
 Barbara Hale
 Darryl Hickman
 Dwayne Hickman
 Dennis Hopper
 Clegg Hoyt
 Dean Jagger
 Vivi Janiss
 Van Johnson
 Phyllis Kirk
 Tommy Kirk
 Cloris Leachman
 Anna Lee
 Viveca Lindfors
 Jack Lord
 Marjorie Lord
 Anita Louise
 Frank Lovejoy
 Sue Lyon
 George Macready
 Dorothy Malone
 Virginia Mayo
 Mercedes McCambridge
 Ethel Merman
 Gary Merrill
 Roger Mobley
 Ricardo Montalbán
 Elizabeth Montgomery
 Bill Mumy
 Burt Mustin
 Alan Napier
 Maidie Norman
 Hugh O'Brian
 Merle Oberon
 Edward Platt
 Marion Ross
 Rosalind Russell
 Natalie Schafer
 William Schallert
 Max Showalter
 Lois Smith
 Barbara Stanwyck
 Jan Sterling
 Robert Sterling
 Hope Summers
 Phyllis Thaxter
 Marshall Thompson
 Mary Treen
 Teresa Wright

Ratings and time slots

 Accolades 
In 1959, the series won a Golden Globe Award for Best TV Show. Loretta Young earned three Best Actress Primetime Emmy Awards in 1955, 1957 and 1959. Norbert Brodine claimed an Emmy for Best Cinematography in 1957. Young also earned Emmy nominations in 1954, 1956, 1958, 1960 and 1961, while Brodine was nominated in 1955, 1956 and 1958 as well. Other Emmy nominations were for Best New Program in 1954, Best Dramatic Series – Less Than One Hour in 1959, Best Direction for Robert Florey in 1955, Best Teleplay Writing – Half Hour or Less for Richard Morris in 1957 and Best Art Direction in a Television Film for Frank Paul Sylos in 1959.

The Directors Guild of America nominated Robert Florey in 1955 and Norman Foster in 1957 for their work on the series.

RebootThe New Loretta Young Show ran for one season on CBS from September 24, 1962, to March 18, 1963, under the alternating sponsorship of Lever Brothers and The Toni Company.  The show was an episodic comedy/drama, with Young playing the role of Christine Massey, a widow raising seven children in suburban Connecticut.  Her romantic interest was Paul Belzer; the two characters were married in the 26th and final episode.  Running against the popular series Ben Casey, the New Loretta Young Show received poor ratings and was not renewed for a second season. 	

Young introduced and closed each episode as herself, as she had done with The Loretta Young Show.  Episodes of The New Loretta Young Show are sometimes included in certain syndicated packages of The Loretta Young Show, with the new series title removed and the original Loretta Young Show'' theme and titles added.

Lyl Productions (Young's company) had a contract dispute and court case with Portland Mason. Aged 13, she was cast as Marnie, then dismissed before the pilot episode was shot. Upset by producers rejecting her wardrobe, which she was contractually required to supply, her mother sent her home to eat lunch and recompose herself. Meanwhile, Lyl decided if she was not back by that afternoon, Celia Kaye would play Marnie. Nobody told the Masons and Portland returned late. After Kaye replaced her, the Masons and Lyl sued each other for breach of contract; the court ruled in favor of the former.

Cast
Loretta Young as Christine Massey 
James Philbrook as Paul Belzer
Dack Rambo as Peter Massey 
Dirk Rambo as Paul Massey
Cindy Carol as Binkie Massey 
Sandy Descher as Judy Massey 
Tracy Stratford as Maria Massey 
Beverly Washburn as Vickie Massey 
Celia Kaye as Marnie Massey

Further reading
 "Tuning in to Women in Television" (National Women's History Museum)

References

External links

The Loretta Young Show at CVTA with episode list

1953 American television series debuts
1961 American television series endings
1962 American television series debuts
1963 American television series endings
1950s American anthology television series
1960s American anthology television series
1950s American drama television series
1960s American drama television series
Black-and-white American television shows
English-language television shows
NBC original programming
Television series about widowhood
Television shows set in Connecticut